Trampas Whiteman is an American writer.

Early life and education
Trampas Whiteman was born July 8, 1972, and grew up in the rural town of Odessa, Missouri. After graduating high school, he attended Central Missouri State University where he gained a Bachelor of Science in broadcasting and film.

Game design and comic books 
Whiteman is the founder of the Whitestone Council, the fan organization behind the Dragonlance Nexus. Since the founding of the council, Trampas has worked with Sovereign Press/Margaret Weis Productions as a designer on the Dragonlance sourcebooks for 3rd edition, including Holy Orders of the Stars, Knightly Orders of Ansalon, and Races of Ansalon. He has contributed to many other Dragonlance sourcebooks, functioning as a compiler and contributor for Lost Leaves from the Inn of the Last Home. Trampas also has credits in Bastion Press' Pale Designs sourcebook, as well as Whitesilver Publishing's Elves sourcebook for Sovereign Stone.

Trampas also wrote the script adaptation for The Legend of Huma comic book series, from issues #3–5 (Dabel Brothers) and #6 (Devil's Due Publishing).

Podcasting 
Whiteman once worked on The Signal, the fan podcast for Firefly and Serenity, writing and reading the "Gaming in the 'Verse" section. He has since moved on to co-create the Dragonlance Canticle and SciFi Smackdown podcasts.

Bibliography 
Whiteman has contributed to the following works:

References

External links 
 Dragonlance Nexus

American fantasy writers
American male novelists
Dungeons & Dragons game designers
Living people
Year of birth missing (living people)